Jayanta Kumar Ray (born 9 December 1934 (East Bengal, Undivided India); died 18 December 2021 (Kolkata, India)) was an Indian historian and National Research Professor.

Awards and recognition

 Eminent Teacher Awards, University of Calcutta, 2014 
 National Research Professor, 2015

Selected publications

Transfer of Power in Indonesia 1942-49, Bombay: Manaktalas, 1967.
Security in the Missile Age, Bombay: Allied, 1967.
Democracy and Nationalism on Trial: A Study of East Pakistan, Shimla: Indian Institute of Advanced Study, 1968.
Portraits of Thai Politics, New Delhi: Orient Longman, 1972.
Public Policy and Global Reality, New Delhi: Radiant, 1977.
Administrators in a Mixed Polity, New Delhi: Macmillan, 1981.
Organizing Villagers for Self-Reliance: A Study of Deedar in Bangladesh, Comilla: Bangladesh Academy for Rural Development, 1983.
Organizing Villagers for Self-Reliance: A Study of Gonoshasthya Kendra in Bangladesh, Calcutta: Orient Longman, 1986.
Centre-State Financial Relations in India (Co-author: Hiroshi Sato), Tokyo: Institute of Developing Economies, 1987. 
To Chase a Miracle: A Study of the Grameen Bank of Bangladesh, Dhaka: The University Press Ltd, 1987.
India : In Search of Good Governance, Kolkata: Maulana Abul Kalam Azad Institute of Asian Studies, 2001.
India’s Foreign Relations, 1947-2007, New Delhi: Routledge, 2011.

References

20th-century Indian historians
Academic staff of the University of Calcutta
1934 births
Living people